Gomila is a settlement in the Municipality of Destrnik in northeastern Slovenia. The area is part of the traditional region of Styria. The municipality is now included in the Drava Statistical Region.

A Roman period burial ground with twelve burial mounds has been identified near the settlement.

References

External links
Gomila on Geopedia

Populated places in the Municipality of Destrnik